Eusthenia is a genus of stonefly in the family Eustheniidae. It is endemic to Australia, with most species native to Tasmania.

It contains the following species: E. brachyptera is considered a subspecies of E. venosa and Eusthenia extensa or Eusthenia purpurescens are considered E. costalis.
 Eusthenia costalis TAS
 Eusthenia lacustris TAS
 Eusthenia nothofagi (Otway stonefly) VIC
 Eusthenia reticulata TAS
 Eusthenia spectabilis TAS
 Eusthenia venosa ACT NSW VIC

References 

Plecoptera
Plecoptera genera
Endemic fauna of Australia
Arthropods of Tasmania
Aquatic insects
Taxa named by John O. Westwood
Taxonomy articles created by Polbot